Rihalo is a town in the Nandiala Department of Boulkiemdé Province in central western Burkina Faso. It has a population of 1,117.

References

Populated places in Boulkiemdé Province